Going Seventeen is the third extended play from South Korean boy band Seventeen. It was released on December 5, 2016, by Pledis Entertainment. The album consists of eight tracks, including the title track, "Boom Boom".

Commercial Performance
The EP sold 269,866+ copies in South Korea. It peaked at number 1 on the Korean Gaon Chart and number 3 on the US World Billboard Chart.

Track listing
Choreographed by Choi Youngjoon and Hoshi (although Hoshi solely created the choreography for "HIGHLIGHT").

Notes:

 "Highlight" is stylized in all caps.

References 

2016 EPs
Korean-language EPs
Kakao M EPs
Seventeen (South Korean band) EPs
Hybe Corporation EPs